Classical genetics is the branch of genetics based solely on visible results of reproductive acts. It is the oldest discipline in the field of genetics, going back to the experiments on Mendelian inheritance by Gregor Mendel who made it possible to identify the basic mechanisms of heredity. Subsequently, these mechanisms have been studied and explained at the molecular level.

Classical genetics consists of the techniques and methodologies of genetics that were in use before the advent of molecular biology. A key discovery of classical genetics in eukaryotes was genetic linkage. The observation that some genes do not segregate independently at meiosis broke the laws of Mendelian inheritance and provided science with a way to map characteristics to a location on the chromosomes. Linkage maps are still used today, especially in breeding for plant improvement.

After the discovery of the genetic code and such tools of cloning as restriction enzymes, the avenues of investigation open to geneticists were greatly broadened. Some classical genetic ideas have been supplanted with the mechanistic understanding brought by molecular discoveries, but many remain intact and in use. Classical genetics is often contrasted with reverse genetics, and aspects of molecular biology are sometimes referred to as molecular genetics.

Basic definitions
At the base of classical genetics is the concept of a gene, the hereditary factor tied to a particular simple feature (or character).

The set of genes for one or more characters possessed by an individual is the genotype. A diploid individual often has two alleles for the determination of a character.

Overview 
Classical genetics is the aspect of genetics concerned solely with the transmission of genetic traits via reproductive acts. Genetics is, generally, the study of genes, genetic variation, and heredity. The process by which characteristics are passed down from parents to their offspring is called heredity. In the sense of classical genetics, variation is known as the lack of resemblance in related individuals and can be categorized as discontinuous or continuous. Genes are a fundamental part of DNA that is aligned linearly on a eukaryotic chromosome. Chemical information that is transported and encoded by each gene is referred to as a trait. Many organisms possess two genes for each individual trait that is present within that particular individual. These paired genes that control the same trait is classified as an allele. In an individual, the allelic genes that are expressed can be either homozygous, meaning the same, or heterozygous, meaning different. Many pairs of alleles have differing effects that are portrayed in an offspring's phenotype and genotype. The phenotype is a general term that defines an individual's visible, physical traits. The genotype of an offspring is known as its genetic makeup. The alleles of genes can either be dominant or recessive. A dominant allele needs only one copy to be expressed while a recessive allele needs two copies (homozygous) in a diploid organism to be expressed. Dominant and recessive alleles help to determine the offspring's genotypes, and therefore phenotypes.

History 

Classical genetics is often referred to as the oldest form of genetics, and began with Gregor Mendel's experiments that formulated and defined a fundamental biological concept known as Mendelian inheritance. Mendelian inheritance is the process in which genes and traits are passed from a set of parents to their offspring. These inherited traits are passed down mechanistically with one gene from one parent and the second gene from another parent in sexually reproducing organisms. This creates the pair of genes in diploid organisms. Gregor Mendel started his experimentation and study of inheritance with phenotypes of garden peas and continued the experiments with plants. He focused on the patterns of the traits that were being passed down from one generation to the next generation. This was assessed by test-crossing two peas of different colors and observing the resulting phenotypes. After determining how the traits were likely inherited, he began to expand the amount of traits observed and tested and eventually expanded his experimentation by increasing the number of different organisms he tested.

About 150 years ago, Gregor Mendel published his first experiments with the test crossing of Pisum peas. Seven different phenotypic characteristics were studied and tested in the peas, including seed color, flower color and seed shape. The seven different characteristics which Mendel selected / checked for the experiment were as follows:
 He checked the different shape of the ripen seeds
 The color of the seed's albumen was checked
 He then selected seed coat color
 Shape of the ripen pods was seen
 Color of the unripened pods was checked
 Flower position on the axial was checked
 Height of the plant was checked, as if it is tall or dwarf.

Mendel took peas that had differing phenotypic characteristics and test-crossed them to assess how the parental plants passed the traits down to their offspring. He started by crossing a round, yellow and round, green pea and observed the resulting phenotypes. The results of this experiment allowed him to see which of these two traits was dominant and which was recessive based upon the number of offspring with each phenotype. Mendel then chose to further his experiments by crossing a pea plant homozygous dominant for round and yellow phenotypes with a pea plant that was homozygous recessive for wrinkled and green. The plants that were originally crossed are known as the parental generation, or P generation, and the offspring resulting from the parental cross is known as the first filial, or F1, generation. The plants of the F1 generation resulting from this hybrid cross were all heterozygous round and yellow seeds.

Classical genetics is a hallmark of the start of great discovery in biology, and has led to increased understanding of multiple important components of molecular genetics, human genetics, medical genetics, and much more. Thus, reinforcing Mendel's nickname as the father of modern genetics.

In other words, we can say that classical genetics is basis of the modern genetics. Classical genetics is the Mendelian genetics or the older concepts of the genetics, which solely expressed based on the phenotypes resulted from breeding experiments while the modern genetics is the new concept of genetics, which allows the direct investigation of genotypes together with phenotypes.

Monohybrid Cross (3:1) 

Dihybrid Cross (9:3:3:1)

See also
 Dominance (genetics)
 Genotype
 Phenotype
 Thomas Hunt Morgan

References